Henning Sommerro (born 3 May 1952 in Surnadal) is a Norwegian musician, composer and professor at NTNU.

Biography 
Sommerro grew up on the Sommerro farm at Skei in Surnadal. His name became widely known in 1977 when the folk music group Vårsøg released their recording of Hans Hyldbakk’s poem Vårsøg.

Sommerro had his first lessons in organ and piano at the age of sixteen at the Music Conservatory in Trondheim. He studied organ there from 1970–1974, and from 1974–1976 he was organist in the villages of Stangvik and Todalen. From 1976–1977 he studied organ and composition at the music academy in Basel, and in 1978 he became director of music at the Teatret Vårt theatre in Molde. From 1985–1990 he was director of music at Trøndelag Teater. Additionally in the years 1986–1988 he was a music consultant for Norwegian radio (NRK P2). Since 1990 he has been a professor at the Department of Music of the Norwegian University of Science and Technology (formerly the Trøndelag Musikkonservatorium).

Sommerro’s performing career began in his youth as a member of the band The Tramps which later changed its name to Mad Movies. In 1977 he made his recording début with the folksong group Vårsøg, which released three records. Sommerro has since that time performed on his own, with various groups, and as an accompanist for, among others, Erik Bye, Sigmund Groven, Geirr Lystrup, Halvdan Sivertsen, Bjørn Alterhaug, Dalakopa, Arve Tellefsen, John Pål Inderberg, Palle Mikkelborg, Åge Aleksandersen, Arne Domnerus, Aly Bain, and Choeur Grégorien de Paris.

Henning Sommerro has written music for over 140 different theatre and film productions. Of these should be mentioned Kjærleikens ferjereiser (film, 1979); An-Magritt (1988, nominated for the Nordic Council Music Prize 2008); Wayfarers (Landstrykere, 1989); the Steinvikholmen opera Olav Engelbrektsson (1993); the sacred operas Jesu siste dager (1997) and Eystein av Nidaros; Partisan Requiem (2000); the folk music ("gammeldans") mass Vindens hjul (1994). He has also set to music poetry by Hans Hyldbakk and hymns by Edvard Hoem.

Discography 
 1977 – Vårsøg with the group Vårsøg
 1978 – Sola e komma with Vårsøg
 1978 – Av moll er du komen, til dur skal du bli with Vårsøg and the choir SKRUK
 1981 – Litt tå meg
 1986 – Neonlys på Ivar Aasen
 1992 – Vårsøg with Trondheim Symphony Orchestra
 1996 – Svarrabærje
 1996 – Follow the Moonstone Aly Bain/The Scottish BT Ensemble
 1996 – Vindens hjul
 2001 – Partisan Requiem
 2006 – Sullabullyam
 2009 – Magnificat
 2009 – Two we go together with Gunnar Andreas Berg
 2013 –  Vintereple
 2013 –  Lussi Langnatt
 2015 –  EDDA TrondheimSolistene and Trondheim Wind Quintet
 2015 –  Vebju together with Anders Larsen
 2018 – Ujamaa with Trondheim Symphony Orchestra
 2019 – Piano Mona Spigseth and TrondheimSolistene
 2021 – Å dikte together with Øyvind Gimse

Awards 
 1978 – Prøysenprisen
 1979 – Spellemannprisen 1979 for Sola e komma (as a member of the group Vårsøg)
 1979 – Møre og Romsdal county cultural prize
 1982 – Special prize awarded by the jury at Spellemannprisen 1981
 1986 – Gammeleng-prisen in the category "studio"
 1987 – Spellmannprisen 1986 for Neonlys på Ivar Aasen
 1987 – Sør-Trøndelag county cultural prize
 1994 – Bræinprisen
 1997 – The Kardemomme award
 2011 – Norsk Korforbund prize
 2015 – Egil Storbekkens Musicprize

Bibliography 

 Bjørn Aksdal. "Henning Sommerro" in Norsk biografisk leksikon
 Arild Hoksnes. Samtaler med Sommerro, 1992

External links 
Sommerro, Henning - Biography at MIC.no
Henning Sommerro er Kommandør av den Kongelege St. Olavs Orden! at Surnadal kommune

1952 births
Living people
Norwegian composers
Norwegian male composers
Norwegian organists
Male organists
Spellemannprisen winners
Grappa Music artists
Norwegian male pianists
21st-century pianists
21st-century organists
21st-century Norwegian male musicians
People from Surnadal